The 1963 1. divisjon was the 19th completed season of top division football in Norway. This was the first regular season were all the top flight teams played in the same group.

Overview
It was contested by 10 teams, and Brann won their second consecutive championship title.

Lyn lead the table after 9 games, and qualified for the 1963–64 European Cup. 

Steinkjer and Gjøvik-Lyn finished 9th and 10th and were relegated to the 2. divisjon.

Teams and locations
''Note: Table lists in alphabetical order.

League table

Results

Season statistics

Top scorer
Leif Eriksen, Vålerengen – 16 goals

Attendances

References
Norway - List of final tables (RSSSF)
Nifs.no (Norsk internasjonal fotballstatistikk)

Eliteserien seasons
Norway
Norway
1